FC Wichita is a soccer club based in Wichita, Kansas that plays in USL League Two's Heartland Conference. The club was a member of the Heartland Conference in the National Premier Soccer League, a national semi-professional league at the fourth tier of the American soccer pyramid, up until the end of the 2019 season.

On January 7, 2017, FC Wichita announced the creation of a women's team.

On January 19, 2021, FC Wichita announced it was joining USL League Two  after five seasons In the NPSL.

Stadium

FC Wichita played its home matches from 2015 to 2017 seasons on the 2,200 capacity Tommy Peckham Championship Field at Stryker Soccer Complex in Wichita, Kansas.

For the 2018 season, FC Wichita was forced to relocate for one season to Trinity Academy. Stryker Soccer Complex underwent a $22 million renovation.

FC Wichita returned to Stryker Stadium for their season opener on May 25, 2019. The updated Stryker Stadium seats more than 6,000 fans.

Men's Year-by-Year

Men's Honors
2015

 NPSL South Central Conference Champions 2015
 2016 Lamar Hunt US Open Cup Berth
 2015 NPSL Staples “Make More Happen” Goal of the Year – Kevin Ten Eyck
 2015 All-NPSL First Team – Kevin Ten Eyck & Matt Clare 
 2015 NPSL Supporters XI First Team – Kevin Ten Eyck & Matt Clare 
 Mitre National Player of the Week for week 12 of the NPSL – Matt Clare 
 NPSL Golden Boot – Matt Clare

2016

 2016 NPSL Staples “Make More Happen” Goal of the Year – Mark Weir
 2017 Lamar Hunt US Open Cup Berth
 2016 All-Conference First Team – Kevin Ten Eyck, James Togbah, Leo Sosa
 2016 All-Conference Honorable Mention – Jeffrey Kyei, Richard Osterloh
 2016 NPSL Showcase Invitation – James Togbah

2017

 2017 Heartland Conference Champions 
 2017 Heartland Conference Tournament Champions 
 2018 Lamar Hunt US Open Cup Berth 
 2017 All-Conference First Team – Deri Corfe, James Togbah, Mark Weir 
 2017 All-Conference Honorable Mention – Matt Clare, Leo Sosa

2018

 2018 US Open Cup Round 3 – Wins over OKC Energy & Tulsa Roughnecks 
 2018 Heartland Conference Champions 
 2018 All-Conference First Team –  Nelson Landaverde, Leo Sosa, Uzi Tayou, James Togbah 
 2018 All-Conference Honorable Mention – Franck Tayou, Thomas Wells, Mark Weir

Head coaches

Larry Inlow was named the first manager for the club in September 2014.

 Larry Inlow (2015)
John Markey (2016)
Steve Ralos (2017)
Blake Shumaker (2018–2019)
Bryan Perez (2019–2021)
Gonzalo Carranza (2022-present)

Men's Fixtures 
All times are Central Standard unless otherwise stated

2015 season

2016 season

2017 season

2018 season

2019 season

2020 season 
FC Wichita did not compete in league competition due to COVID-19.

2021 season 

1 Due to plane issues with Delta Airlines, FC Wichita was unable to travel on multiple occasions to Green Bay, Wisconsin. With both teams out of the playoff race, the USL League Two cancelled the match.

2 With Kaw Valley forfeiting Green Bay on the division's final day, USL League Two chose to send Chicago to Green Bay for an exhibition, thus cancelling the match with CUFC.

2022 season 

1 Chicago Dutch Lions forfeited due to travel issues prior to the match.

FC Wichita Women 
As stated above, the FC Wichita women were announced as the first professional women's club in Wichita first competing in the Women's Premier Soccer League from 2017 through 2019.

Inlow announced in the introductory press conference Hutchinson Community College Women's soccer head coach, Sammy Lane, would lead the inaugural season for FC Wichita. He also introduced University of Kansas alum, Whitney Berry, Jami Reichenberger, Peyton Vincze, and Kansas State's Brookelynn Entz, who at the time was a high school player for Newton High.

On January 18, 2021, FC Wichita announced they would join the United Women's Soccer League.

Women's Year-by-Year

Women's Fixtures
All times are Central Standard unless otherwise stated

2017 season

2018 season

2019 season

2020 season 
FC Wichita women did not field a team due to COVID-19 In 2020.

2021 season 
FC Wichita announced their first year in the United Women's Soccer League

1 Springfield had COVID-19 and had to forfeit.

2022 season

References

External links
 

National Premier Soccer League teams
Soccer clubs in Kansas
Sports in Wichita, Kansas